Rob Laird may refer to:

Rob Laird (ice hockey) (born 1954), ice hockey player
Rob Laird (Drive), a character in Drive